Wojciech Tyszyński (born December 12, 1984 in Sztum) is a Polish sprint canoer who has competed since 2003. He won three medals at the ICF Canoe Sprint World Championships with a gold (C-4 1000 m: 2005) and two bronzes (C-2 1000 m: 2007, C-4 1000 m: 2003).

Tyszyński also finished seventh in the C-2 1000 m event at the 2008 Summer Olympics in Beijing.

References

Sports-reference.com profile

1984 births
Living people
People from Sztum
Canoeists at the 2008 Summer Olympics
Olympic canoeists of Poland
Polish male canoeists
ICF Canoe Sprint World Championships medalists in Canadian
Sportspeople from Pomeranian Voivodeship